James Holloway (died June 28, 2020) was an artist whose work appeared in role-playing games.

Background
Jim Holloway was self taught in illustration, although he was able to study some oil paintings by his father.

Works
Jim Holloway produced interior illustrations for many Dungeons & Dragons books and Dragon magazine starting in 1981, as well as cover art for The Land Beyond the Magic Mirror and Dungeonland (1983), and Mad Monkey vs. the Dragon Claw (1988), the Spelljammer: AD&D Adventures in Space boxed set (1989), and Ronin Challenge (1990).

Holloway was the original artist for the Paranoia role-playing game, and also did the cover for Tales from the Floating Vagabond from Avalon Hill. He also created artwork for many products from FASA's BattleTech game line (BattleTech, CityTech, AeroTech, etc.). He produced artwork for many other games including Chill (Pacesetter Ltd) and Sovereign Stone (Sovereign Press). He also created the opening and closing animation sequences for the video game Beyond Shadowgate.

He worked with actress/models such as Brinke Stevens and Crystal Gonzales.

Personal life
On June 28, 2020, on Holloway's Facebook group page "The Art of Jim Holloway", Holloway's son posted a notice that he had died earlier that day.

References

External links
 

2020 deaths
Role-playing game artists
Year of birth missing